The enzyme dehydro-L-gulonate decarboxylase catalyzes the chemical reaction

3-dehydro-L-gulonate  L-xylulose + CO2

This enzyme belongs to the family of lyases, specifically the carboxy-lyases, which cleave carbon-carbon bonds.  The systematic name of this enzyme class is 3-dehydro-L-gulonate carboxy-lyase (L-xylulose-forming).   This enzyme participates in pentose and glucuronate interconversions.

References

 

EC 4.1.1
Enzymes of unknown structure